Onodera (written: 小野寺 or オノデラ in katakana) is a Japanese surname. Notable people with the surname include:

, Japanese baseball player
, Japanese politician
, Japanese curler
Lisa Onodera, American film producer
Masaya Onodera, Japanese mixed martial artist
, Japanese badminton player
Midi Onodera, Japanese-Canadian filmmaker
, Japanese footballer
, Japanese volleyball player
, Japanese footballer
, Japanese daimyō
, Japanese photographer

Fictional characters
, a character in the manga series Nisekoi
, a character in the manga series Nisekoi
, a character in the manga series Sekai-ichi Hatsukoi
, a character in the television series Kamen Rider Decade

Japanese-language surnames